Tebi may refer to:

Tebi language, of Papua New Guinea
Tebi Rural LLG, Papua New Guinea
Tebi-, a binary prefix

See also
 Tebis (Technische Entwicklung Beratung und Individuelle Software), a CAD/CAM program